Crave is an American hip hop and R&B musical group from Pittsburgh, Pennsylvania.

Made up of singers Mandell Loman, Maurice Walker and Manny Deanda, the group self-released an album, Demboyz, in 2005. The band signed with Universal Records in 2007. They released a single, "Freaky Deaky", in collaboration with Miami-based hip hop/R&B group Pretty Ricky. The single received play on the Pittsburgh urban radio station WAMO. The group toured with Pretty Ricky in 2007, performing in the Midwest, including dates in Cincinnati, Ohio and Memphis, Tennessee.

References

Masley, Ed (February 15, 2006). "CRAVE takes its shot with a music video". Pittsburgh Post-Gazette. Retrieved on April 10, 2008.
Mervis, Scott (April 12, 2007). "Local Scene: 04/12/07". Pittsburgh Post-Gazette. Retrieved on April 10, 2008.
Todd, Deborah M. (January 17, 2008). "2nd annual Hip Hop Awards rallies the scene in the Hilton ballroom". Pittsburgh Post-Gazette. Retrieved on April 10, 2008.
"BEST HIP-HOP ACT: CRAVE". December 7, 2005. Pittsburgh City Paper.

External links
Official website

American contemporary R&B musical groups
Musical groups from Pennsylvania
Musical groups from Pittsburgh